Nathan Read (July 2, 1759 – January 20, 1849) was an American engineer and steam pioneer.

Nathan Read was the true inventor of the high-pressure steam engine in 1789, this was twelve years before the steam-engine was known to be used in the form of a high-pressure engine, and led a great revolution in steam power to navigation and land-transport.

Early life and family
Nathan Read was born in the town of Western (later re-named "Warren") in the Province of Massachusetts Bay, on July 2, 1759. His ancestors came from Newcastle-upon-Tyne, northeast England. 
His father, Reuben Read, was an officer in the Revolutionary service and his mother's maiden name was Tamsin Meacham <ref/"Strobridge 1912">.

In 1774, Nathan Read commenced his preparatory studies for college. At the close of the summer vacation of 1777, he became a student at Harvard University.

Harvard University
At Harvard, Read studied medicine and graduated in 1781. He taught school in Beverly and Salem and was elected a tutor in Harvard University. After graduating, he became a scholar until 1783. Then, he was elected a tutor and continued his labors as such where he continued until 1787. He was elected a Fellow of the American Academy of Arts and Sciences in 1791.

As an apothecary
Then, he opened an apothecary store in Salem and developed potassium bicarbonate (KHCO3) in 1788, but kept the store for only one year.

High-pressure steam engine
From October 1788, Nathan Read quit the last work and began to make a number of improvements of the steam engine. He invented and patented the multi-tubular boiler. He then made efforts to improve the function of the steam cylinder, and placed it in a horizontal position so the engine could sustain much higher pressure, that is to say, Read invented the high-pressure steam engine, a new kind of steam engine, different from James Watt's old engine.
Read made the engine more convenient and portable, also much lighter and safer. The most important was that the new engine needed much less room and fuel than the old one. Read successfully reconstructed the steam engine; he modified the Watt engine to a high-pressure engine that could be widely used in new fields, such as steamboat and locomotive.

Use in transportation
To prove the usefulness of the high-pressure steam engine, Read made several models of steamcar and steamboat in 1790. Read's experiment was very successful; it proved that the engine he built functioned well. He also invented the chain-wheel for paddle wheels to propel the steamboat, and set up a shipbuilding factory with his friends in 1796. There is, however, no evidence he ever built a full-scale version of his models.

Nail machine
Several years later, Read made another important innovation.  He developed a new machine, which could be used for cutting and heading nails at one operation. It was patented on January 8, 1798.  A sample of this machine is owned by the Peabody Essex Museum.

Other inventions
He developed a style of rotary steam engine in 1817.

In agricultural areas, he had more inventions and plans, such as threshing machine, thrashing machine, different forms of pumping engines and a new kind of windmill. He developed a plan for using the expansion and contraction of metals, multiplied by levers, widely used in winding up clocks and other purposes. He patented some of them, but others were mainly used in agricultural fields and never patented.

Marriage
Nathan Read married Elizabeth Jeffrey in October 1790.

Politics
Read was selected as a Federalist to the Sixth Congress to fill the vacancy caused by the resignation of Samuel Sewall; and was popularly elected to the Seventh Congress and served from November 25, 1800, to March 3, 1803. He was not a candidate for renomination in 1802. In 1803, he was judge of the Court of Common Pleas of Essex County. In 1807, he moved to Belfast, Maine, and was judge of the county court of Hancock County that year. He was instrumental in establishing Belfast Academy and served as trustee for forty years. He died near Belfast; interment was in Grove Cemetery, Belfast.

Notes

References
 
 Engines of our Ingenuity No. 2089 NATHAN READ by John H. Lienhard
 Nathan Read his invention of the multi-tubular boiler and portable high-pressure engine, and discovery of the true mode of applying steam-power to navigation and railways. A contribution to the early history of the steamboat and locomotive engine, 1870}
 Scientific American, May 5, 1870, Page 328, "Nathan Read, the Inventor of the Multi-Tubular Boiler" (obituary)}

External links 
 

1759 births
1849 deaths
Harvard University alumni
Massachusetts state court judges
Maine state court judges
People from Warren, Massachusetts
People from Belfast, Maine
Fellows of the American Academy of Arts and Sciences
18th-century American inventors
19th-century American inventors
Federalist Party members of the United States House of Representatives from Massachusetts
Inventors from Massachusetts